The Merbl Palace is a monumental building in the Victory Square of Timișoara, Romania. It is part of the Corso interwar urban ensemble, listed as a historical monument of national importance.

History 
The Merbl Palace was built in 1911, in the Secession style with Baroque elements, according to the plans of Arnold Merbl, the builder of the Lloyd Palace in the same square. The Neuhaus Palace alternates between the two. Merbl was an important builder from Timișoara, his company Arnold Merbl & Co. being also known outside the city. He also contributed to the construction of the Piarist complex between 1904 and 1908.

The three-story building has a corner tower facing the side street. During the communist period, the ground floor of the building housed the Mihai Eminescu Bookstore, the largest bookstore in the city.

References 

Buildings and structures in Timișoara
Buildings and structures completed in 1911